The Bloody Vultures of Alaska (German: Die blutigen Geier von Alaska) is a 1973 German Western film directed by Harald Reinl and starring Doug McClure, Harald Leipnitz and Angelica Ott. It was made as a co-production between West Germany and Yugoslavia. The film's sets were designed by the art director Željko Senečić. Location shooting took place around Dachstein in Austria and the Plitvice Lakes and Dubrovnik in Yugoslavia. It is set in Alaska during the Klondike Gold Rush.

Cast

References

External links
 

1973 films
1973 Western (genre) films
1970s historical adventure films
Constantin Film films
Films directed by Harald Reinl
Films scored by Bruno Nicolai
Films set in Alaska
Films set in the 1890s
Films shot in Austria
Films shot in Croatia
German Western (genre) films
German historical adventure films
Northern (genre) films
West German films
Yugoslav Western (genre) films
Yugoslav historical adventure films
1970s German-language films
1970s German films